Böyük Oyun (The Great Game) is an Azerbaijani football rivalry between Neftçi Baku and Khazar Lankaran. The fixture had developed into an intense and often bitter one, traditionally attracting large attendances. The tie was played out at numerous venues across the cities, with Khazar Lankaran Central Stadium being the stadium most synonymous with the fixture, having hosted more games than any other.

History

Cultural rivalry 

The clubs have large support bases around Baku, but also have supporters clubs in most towns throughout Azerbaijan. The relationship between the two clubs has always been known for its great animosity, as the classic opposes two geographic regions - with Neftchi and Khazar Lankaran representing the north and south of Azerbaijan, respectively.

Football rivalry 
The first game played between the two sides was an Azerbaijan Premier League fixture on Wednesday, 8 December 2004. The game, staged at Lankaran City stadium, finished 1-1 draw. Both clubs compete each other for the title of the most successful football club in the country.

The Great Game Marathon 
In 2011, the derby reached its ultimate peak as both clubs had to play each other 4 times during 33 days, after Azerbaijan Cup draws and Azerbaijan Premier League format changes. Khazar once became triumphant over Neftchi, even though all other remaining games ended in draw.

Unbeaten series of Khazar Lankaran 

Khazar Lankaran has the longest unbeaten series in Great Games. Last time Lankaran side lost to Neftchi on 12 April 2009 (2:1). After that date 11 games have been played between both teams in all competitions. In three of last eleven encounters Khazar Lankaran beat their rival and other matches finished with draw.

On 6 November 2011, Neftchi broke Khazar's 938 days of unbeaten run and recorded the biggest win in derby, by beating Khazar 5-0 in Baku.

Current issues 
The rivalry intensified in 2013 due to the final of the Azerbaijan Cup.  Several accusations of unsportsmanlike behaviour from both teams and a war of words erupted throughout the fixtures which included post-match fight between fans and players.

Supporters rivalry 
The rivalry turned bitter after Neftchi won Azerbaijan Premier League title by beating Khazar Lankaran in play off match. Over time, the rivalry became more heated and club fans began attaining collective identities. Neftchi was seen as a capital club, while Khazar was viewed as regional club and supported by the south regions of Azerbaijani society.

Crowd attendances for first 21 games, has exceeded 229,000 supporters.

All-time results

League

Cup

Statistics

Head to head record

Note: League championship statistics includes play-off match for the 2004–05 title, which Neftchi won 2–1.

Statistics obtained from Apasport

Highest attendance

Highest goalscorers

Switching sides
(In bold: Transfer between both clubs)

Players
Transfers between both clubs are rare, only few in last decade.

Managers
 Agaselim Mirjavadov (Neftchi 1987–88; 2004–06, Khazar 2006–10)

See also
Neftchi Baku
Khazar Lankaran
Major football rivalries

References

External links
Neftchi Baku Official website 
Khazar Lankaran Official website  

Azerbaijan Premier League
Association football rivalries
Football in Azerbaijan
Neftçi PFK
Khazar Lankaran FK
2004 establishments in Azerbaijan
Recurring sporting events established in 2004
Nicknamed sporting events